Ibn Sahl (Arabic:  أبو إسحاق إبرهيم بن سهل الإسرائيلي الإشبيلي Abu Ishaq Ibrahim Ibn Sahl al-Isra'ili al-Ishbili) of Seville (1212–1251) is considered one of the greatest Andalusi poets of the 13th century.  He was a Jewish convert to Islam.

Ibn Sahl was born  in 1212–3 in a Jewish family in Seville. Already in 1227, he drew some attention to himself by suggesting of adding a sentence to a poem made by renowned poet. Despite his Jewish family background Ibn Sahl was a devout Muslim. His diwan (collected works) are a testimony to his deep felt religious feelings. Some have criticized Ibn Sahl because he drank wine. The sincerity of his conversion (probably very early in his life), however, was never questioned.

When Seville came into the hands of Ferdinand III of Castile in 1248, Ibn Sahl left for Ceuta, where he became the secretary of the Almohad governor Abu Ali Ibn Khallas. When Ibn Khallas sent his son to al-Mustanir I, the caliph of the Hafsids of Ifriqiya, he decided to send Ibn Sahl with him. The galley with which they travelled was shipwrecked and all the passengers perished. The governor is to have said about Ibn Sahl: "The pearl is returned to the sea."

The diwan of Ibn Sahl contains the most refined examples of Andalusian poetry, almost exclusively love poetry and muwashsahat.
Mostly known for his love poetry in muwashshah form, Ibn Sahl two young male lover addressees, Mûsâ ibn ʿAbd al-Ṣamad and Muḥammad, are thought by some to represent the two religions that played important roles in his life, his original Judaism and the Islam to which he converted. Others hold that the youths were historical individuals.

The Moroccan author Mohammed al-Ifrani (1670–1747) wrote a biography of Ibn Sahl.

An example of a love poem by Ibn Sahl
O full moons that arose on the day of departure,
bright, going forth on peril’s path:
My heart bears no sin in loving; instead
from you comes beauty; from my eye, the glance.
I rejoice though wounded by passion;
mutuality with my beloved is only imaginary.
Whenever I complain of my passion to him, he smiles
like the hills at the pouring cloud,
When it brings rain to them, like a funeral,
while they, in their joy, are a wedding celebration.
Does the protected fawn know he inflamed
the heart of a lover in which he dwelt,
So that it burns and throbs just like
the firebrand teased by the east wind?

References

Arie Schippers "Humorous approach of the divine in the poetry of Al-Andalous, the case of Ibn Sahl" In: Gert Borg, Ed de Moor (ed.) Representations of the Divine in Arabic Poetry, Amsterdam, Atlanta  2001 

1212 births
Converts to Islam from Judaism
Jewish poets
13th-century Arabic poets
1251 deaths
Poets from al-Andalus
People from Seville
Deaths by drowning
Almohad poets